Robin Hood Makes Good is a 1939 Warner Bros. Merrie Melodies cartoon short, directed by Chuck Jones and written by Dave Monahan. The short was released on February 11, 1939.

Plot

Three little squirrels, after reading a book about Robin Hood, decide to act out the part of the legendary medieval outlaw. The smallest of the three declares that he will be Robin Hood, prompting the middle squirrel to breathe down his neck and demand, "Who's gonna be Robin Hood?", prompting an intimidated reply of "You're gonna be Robin Hood!" In turn, the biggest squirrel bullies the middle one,  "Who's gonna be Robin Hood?" "You're gonna be Robin Hood!".

That decided, the Robin Hood squirrel names the middle squirrel as Little John, leaving the grumbling smallest squirrel to play the unwanted role of the Sheriff of Nottingham. The small squirrel trudges off to await the inevitable song-and-dance attack of Robin Hood and Little John, while a fox, lurking on the side, sees them as his dinner and devises a ruse through which he pipes up, in a falsetto voice, claiming to be Robin's sweetheart Maid Marian in trouble. Robin and Little John follow the bait into the fox's cabin, whereupon the fox drops his pretense and his falsetto and hangs the two up by their breeches on the wall, declaring his intention to make a stew out of them.

The smallest squirrel, looking in from the outside of the cabin, devises a plan to save his friends. By means of voice imitations and sound effects, he makes the fox believe that hunters are after him. After he literally turns yellow and panics, in fear of his life, he runs away at maximum speed, beating the cabin door which accompanies him upright on his flight from reality. After being rescued, the two exit the cabin, only to be greeted by the smallest squirrel, who asks them with a grin, "Who's gonna be Robin Hood?"

Reception

The Film Daily (March 6, 1939) : Funny Squirrels: "The adventures of three squirrels who find a book all about the career of Robin Hood. So they decide to emulate the ancient hero, and merry outlaws of the woods start on adventure bent. A fox reads the book they have discarded, and starts taking advantage of their make-believe game. He lures the two older squirrels into a log cabin, locks them in and prepares to make a nice meal. The younger squirrel rescues them and as his reward insists on being Robin Hood".

References

External links

Short films directed by Chuck Jones
1939 films
1939 animated films
Merrie Melodies short films
Robin Hood films
Animated films about squirrels
Animated films about foxes
Films scored by Carl Stalling
1930s Warner Bros. animated short films